The Mystery of the Jewelled Moth is the second novel in The Sinclair's Mysteries series by British children's author Katherine Woodfine, publishing by Egmont Publishing in February 2016. The novel is the second book in a four book mystery-adventure series set in Edwardian England. The first book in the series was The Mystery of the Clockwork Sparrow which was Waterstones Children's Book of the Month in June 2015.

Plot 
Sophie is an orphan who has been left penniless when her father dies. In The Mystery of the Clockwork Sparrow, Sophie finds a job in the millinery department of Sinclair’s Department store and makes friends with Billy, a junior porter, and Lil, a “mannequin” by day and an aspiring actress by night.
In The Mystery of the Jewelled Moth, the Jewelled Moth, a priceless piece, disappears, and again Sophie, Lil and Billy have to solve the mystery, this time by infiltrating Lord Beaucastle’s fancy dress ball. Sophie had come face to face in The Mystery of the Clockwork Sparrow with the mysterious Baron, the arch-villain of the East End, and in The Mystery of the Jewelled Moth, Sophie gets even closer.

Characters 
 Sophie: The main character, an orphan whose father died and left her penniless
 Lil: Sophie's best friend, whom she met when they both started working at Sinclair's Department Store
 Billy: A friend of Sophie's, whom she also met at Sinclair's Department Store
 Joe: A street urchin, whom the trio first met when he hid in the basement of Sinclair's Department Store to hide from the East End gang he escaped
 The Baron: The mysterious criminal mastermind

Publishing details 
 Author: Katherine Woodfine
 First published: February 2016
 
 Publisher: Egmont Publishing
 Age range: 9+ years
 Genre: Children's Mystery Adventure Series

References

External links

 Goodreads title page

2016 British novels
2016 children's books
British mystery novels
British children's novels
Children's historical novels
Children's mystery novels
Novels about orphans
Egmont Books books